Ferberite is the iron endmember of the manganese - iron wolframite solid solution series. The manganese endmember is hübnerite. Ferberite is a black monoclinic mineral composed of iron(II) tungstate, FeWO4.

Ferberite and hübnerite often contain both divalent cations of iron and manganese, with wolframite as the intermediate species for which the solid solution series is named.

Ferberite occurs as granular masses and as slender prismatic crystals. It has a Mohs hardness of 4.5 and a specific gravity of 7.4 to 7.5.  Ferberite typically occurs in pegmatites, granitic greisens, and high temperature hydrothermal deposits. It is a minor ore of tungsten.

Ferberite was discovered in 1863 in Sierra Almagrera, Spain, and named after the German mineralogist Moritz Rudolph Ferber (1805–1875).

See also
List of minerals
List of minerals named after people

References

External links

Mineral Galleries

Iron(II) minerals
Tungstate minerals
Monoclinic minerals
Minerals in space group 13